Sharon Fichman and Maryna Zanevska were the defending champions, but both players chose not to participate.

Asia Muhammad and Maria Sanchez won the all-American final, defeating Jamie Loeb and Allie Will, 6–3, 1–6, [10–8].

Seeds

Draw

References 
 Draw

Odlum Brown Vancouver Open
Vancouver Open